WGAB (1180 AM) is a radio station  broadcasting a Christian radio format. Licensed to Newburgh, Indiana, United States, the station serves the Evansville area.  The station is currently owned by Faith Broadcasting, LLC.

History
On 2005-02-17, WGAB transferred ownership from Newburgh Broadcasting Corporation to Faith Broadcasting International.

References

External links

GAB
Radio stations established in 1990